Paul Goldberg may refer to:

 Paul Goldberg (geologist), American geologist

See also
 Pål Golberg (born 1990), Norwegian cross country skier
 Paul Goldberger (born 1950), American architectural critic and educator